Min-ju, also spelled Min-joo, is a Korean unisex given name. Its meaning depends on the hanja used to write each syllable of the name. There are 27 hanja with the reading "min" and 56 hanja with the reading "ju" on the South Korean government's official list of hanja which may be registered for use in given names.

People with this name include:
 Minju Kim (born ), South Korean fashion designer
 Joo (singer) (born Jun Min-joo, 1990), South Korean singer
 Kim Min-ju (born 2001), South Korean singer, member of girl group Iz*One

See also
List of Korean given names

References

Korean unisex given names